The powada is a genre of Marathi poetry that was  during the late 17th century in India. Powada, which means ‘to glorify’, is a traditional Marathi ballad that traces its history to more than 750 years Powadas often glorified and celebrated deeds of popular folk figures and leaders such as Chhatrapati Shivaji and Tanaji Malusare, and were also written to raise awareness on social issues such as female foeticide, dowry and corruption. Powadas were also used as a medium to create an awareness during Samyukta Maharashtra movement.

Powada is also a genre of poetry popular in Uttarakhand, specifically that glorifies warriors. It is popular in Kumaun as well as Garhwal regions of the state and is sung, performed or narrated on various occasions. It is also known as "Bhada"

Details
The composer-cum-singers of the powadas are known as Shahirs. The professional powada singers formed a guild or caste known as the Gondhalis. The earliest notable powada was The Killing of Afzal Khan (अफझल खानाचा वध) by Agnidas, which recorded Shivaji's encounter with Afzal Khan. The next notable powada was Tanaji Malusare (तानाजी मालुसरे ) by Tulsidas, which gave an account of the capture of Sinhagad Fort by Tanaji. Another notable contemporary powada was Baji Pasalkar (बाजी पसाळकर ) by Yamaji Bhaskar. They are also mentioned in the 13th century Marathi scripture Dnyaneshwari.

During the Maratha Confederacy rule, several celebrated Shahir poet-singers, which include Ram Joshi (1762–1812), Anant Phandi (1744–1819), Honaji Bala (1754–1844) and Prabhakar (1769–1843),  Annabhau Sathe (1920 - 1969), Atmaram Patil and Amar Sheikh composed a number of powadas.

About sixty powadas were collected by Harry Arbuthnot Acworth and S. T. Shaligram and published under the title, The Saga of Historical Heroic Men and Women (इतिहास प्रसिद्ध महापुरुषांचे व स्त्रियांचे पोवाडे ) in 1891. Out of these, ten powadas were translated into English verse by H. A. Acworth and published as Ballads of the Marathas in 1894.

In popular culture
 In the Marathi movie, Me Shivajiraje Bhosale Boltoy (2009), the powada, Afzal Khanacha Vadh is played.
 Tanhaji, a 2020 Hindi movie, was made based on the Tanaji Malusare powada.

See also
 Marathi literature
 Indian literature

References

H. A. Acworth and S. T. Shaligramgot the powada of afazaj vadha written by aagindas in kolhapur shivshahir purshottam raut

External links
 A website on powada
 Povada/पोवाडा at TransLiteral.org

Marathi-language literature
 
Indian styles of music